Mario Chiari (14 July 1909 – 8 April 1989) was an Italian production designer and art director. He was nominated for an Academy Award in the category Best Art Direction for the film Doctor Dolittle.

Selected filmography
 Un giorno nella vita (1946)
 The Enemy (1952)
 At Sword's Edge (1952)
 House of Ricordi (1954)
 Le notti bianche (1957)
 The Son of the Red Corsair (1959)
 Doctor Dolittle (1967)
 King Kong (1976)

References

External links

1909 births
1989 deaths
Italian production designers
Italian art directors